Tough Enough may refer to:

Tough Enough (1983 film), film starring Dennis Quaid
Tough Enough (2006 film) (Knallhart), German film
WWE Tough Enough, professional wrestling reality TV show
"Tough Enough" (song), song by Vanilla Ninja from Traces of Sadness

See also
Tuff Enuff
 "Tuff Enuff" (song)
Tuff E Nuff